The Masubia are a tribe in Caprivi Strip whose traditional authority (ikuta) is based in Bukalo.

History
They Masubia originate from Central Africa. In Southern Africa they first settled in the Goha Hills of Botswana. Due to the tribal conflicts in Botswana, they moved to the great Caprivi. In that region they erected their headquarters in Bukalo under the leadership of the first Masubia king, King Sanjo. The invasion of the Lozi of Zambia and the Kololo of South Africa between the 17th and 18th century led to the current blend of cultures, language, and traditions.

Subiya Royal Lineage

1.Iteenge (1440s/1570s) 
He was the first known chief of the tribe. He is believed to have led the migration from the North and settled at Kafue floodplains. The Zambezi–Chobe basin is known as Iteenge in Subiya after him.

2.Ikuhane (1575 - 1600)
He was the son of Iteenge and the second chief of the tribe. He migrated from the Kafue floodplains and settled along the Zambezi valley in present-day Zambia. He later moved southwards and settled along the Chobe River which is called Ikuhane in Subiya.
 
3.Lilundu - Lituu (1640 – 1665)
He succeeded his father Chief Ikuhane. He migrated from the Chobe River southwards and settled at Mababe (Mavava) south of Savuti (Savuta) in present-day Botswana.

4.Queen Mwale Ikuhane (1665 – 1700)
She was the first queen to rule the Subiya tribe. She succeeded her brother Lilundu - Lituu and settled at Goha Hills north of Savuti in present Botswana and the place came to be known as Ngulwa-Mwaale.

5.Cheete (1700s)
He ruled over a section of the Subiya who fled Lozi attacks and lived in Tokaland near Livingstone, Zambia.

6.Sikute (1700s)
Sikute led a section of the Subiya from the western tips of Iteenge today known as Linyanti swamps to the Chungwe-namutitima (Victoria Falls). There he joined the Leya and married one of their women. Sikute carried with him the Subiya royal drums known as the Makuwakuwa which had mystical powers. Sikute was also believed to have a pot of medicine which when opened released an epidemic in an area. Due to Sikute’s migration the Subiya became one of the tribes of the Victoria Falls together with the Leya and the Toka. It is believed that when Chief Mukuni of the Leya defeated the Subiya of Sikute and captured them together with their royal drums, the magical drums escaped into the Zambezi and settled at the bottom where their sound continued to be heard for many years afterwards.

7.Saanjo(1700s)
He was also called Singongi. He succeeded Queen Mwaale at Goha Hills (Ngulwa-Mwaale) in Chobe District, Botswana. Saanjo had three children with his wife Chaaze, two boys called Mafwira I and Nsundano I and their sister Mwaale.

8.Mafwira I (1700s)
He was the eldest son of Chief Saanjo with his wife Chaaze. He led the Subiya migration from Goha Hills back to the Ikuhane (Chobe) River and settled at Kavimba in the present Chobe enclave, Botswana. His rule was unpopular and soon deposed and replaced by his younger brother, Nsundano I.

9.Nsundano I (1700s -1750)
He was also called Lyiverenge. He migrated northwards from Kavimba and established his headquarters at Luchindo in the present Caprivi Strip, Namibia, opposite Ngoma border post. Today Luchindo is a shrine (Chidino) of all the Basubiya tribe.

10.Liswani I (1830-1845) 
He was the son of Princess Mwaale, the daughter of Chief Saanjo and sister to Mafwira I and Nsundano I. His father was Sikarumbu, who was also known as Raliswani. He succeeded Nsundano I; his maternal uncle. He was married to Malyangala with whom he had a son named Maiba I. He had his headquarters at Isuswa in the modern Caprivi Strip, Namibia. He rescued Sekgoma I, son of Kgari of Bamangwato and Letsholathebe, son of Moremi I of Batawana from Sebitwane at Kazungula.

11.Nkonkwena I (1845-1876) 
He was known by his nickname ‘Mutolalizuki’. He was the son of Princess Nsazwe, the elder sister of Chief Liswani I. His father was Kabende. Chief Nkonkwena had three sisters namely, Ntolwa, Mpambo and Chire. Chief Nkonkwena I was a polygamist. His wives were Nkungano and Ikume. Ikume begot Mafwira II, the chief of the Subiya of Gumare in north-west Botswana and his brother Nsundano. Ikume gave birth to one son called Sinvula. He established his headquarters at Impalila Island in the modern Caprivi Strip, Namibia. He fled from Barotse to seek refuge in Khama's land, where he died at Rakops in 1878.

12.Queen Ntolwa (1876-1900) 
She was the younger sister of Nkonkwena I and the second queen to rule the Subiya. She was married toMbanga and had four sons named Chombo, Mwampole, Kasaila, and Mwanamwali. She built her royal palace at Isuswa in the present-day Caprivi Strip, Namibia. She succeeded her brother Chief Nkonkwena I, after the latter feared the Lozi and fled to Boteti.

13.Mwanamwale I (1876)
He was the son of Queen Ntolwa with her husband Mbanga. He and a section of Subiya men were following his fleeing uncle Nkonkwena, who was heading for Boteti. They went as far as Sitengu Pan, about twenty-eight miles south of Kasane but failed to catch him up. They then returned to Impalila Island, crossed the Zambezi and established his leadership at Sesheke in Zambia.

14.Mwanamwale II 
He succeeded MwanamwaleI; his father at Sesheke, Zambia. His real name was Munikuunku, but he was famously known by his nickname Inguu, meaning the shepherd.

15.Kabuku (August 1886) 
He was installed Subiya chief at Sesheke now in the Western Province of Zambia. In Sesheke the Subiya chief’s title is Mwanamwale as opposed to Muniteenge or Moraliswani used in Caprivi Strip and Chobe District. He probably succeeded Mwanamwale II.

16.Maiba I (1900 – 1909)
He was the only son of Liswani I. He fled to Boteti under the guidance of his cousin Nkonkwena I. He returned from Boteti in the 1900 and succeeded Queen Ntoolwa at Isuswa as the Subiya Chief in Caprivi Strip, Namibia. By now Subiya chieftainship was divided along colonial lines of Northern Rhodesia, South West Africa, Namibia and Bechuanaland Protectorate.

17. Chika II (1901-1927) He was also called Chika Chika. He was the son of a commoner, Chika, and Malyangala. Chika was a hunter from Zambia who came to live among Basubia. He died leaving his wife, Malyangala, pregnant. At the time Muniteenge Liswani I married Malyangala while she was still pregnant. Malyangala gave birth to a boy, and Liswani I gave him the name of Chika, his real father. Chika Chika was among the Basubiya who fled from Mpalila Islands to Rakops under the leadership of Nkonkwena I in 1876. He returned from Rakops in 1900 and settled briefly among a section of Basubiya at Mababe (Mavava).In 1901 he was installed regent of Basubiya at Munga west of Kavimba on behalf of the young Prince Sinvula Nkonkwena who was then living among the Basubiya of Livingstone in the former Northern Rhodesia (today's Zambia).

18.Chika Matondo Tongo (1909 – 1927 and 1937 - 1945) 
He was a regent acting for the young Liswaninyana. Liswaninyana was the eldest son of Chief Maiba I and Chika-Matondo Tongo was appointed regent by virtue of marriage to Mulela; who was Liswaninyana’s maternal aunt. He established his headquarters at Schuckmansburg (Luhonono) in Eastern Caprivi, Namibia.

19.Liswaninyana (1927-1937)
He was the eldest son of Maiba I with his wife Kahundu. He established his royal headquarters at Kasika Village in the modern Caprivi Strip, Namibia opposite Chiduudu (Sedudu Island). He died shortly after assuming the throne and Chika Matondo continued to act on the throne till 1945.

20.Sinvula Nkonkwena (1928-1968) 
He was born in Khama’s land; Tsienyane at Rokops. He was the son of Chief Nkonkwena I with his wife Ikume. He established his headquarters at Munga Village north-west of Kavimba, Chobe District, Botswana. His brothers were Mafwira II and Nsundano.

21.Sinvula Maiba (1945-1965) 
He was the son of Maiba I and also the younger brother of Liswaninyana. His home village was Mahundu in the present-day Eastern Caprivi Strip, Namibia. He built his headquarters at Kabbe Village in the present Eastern Caprivi Strip, Namibia.

22.Mutwa Liswani II (1965-1996)
He was the second eldest son of Sinvula Maiba above. His elder brother was Shakufweba. He established his royal headquarters at Vwikalo (Bukalo) in the present-day Caprivi Strip, Namibia.

23.Maiba II Sinvula (1968-to date)
He is the son of Sinvula Nkonkwena and also the grandson of Nkonkwena I. He succeeded his aged father and set his headquarters at Kavimba Village, Chobe District, Botswana.

24.Maiba Liswani III (1996–to July 21, 2021) 
He is the youngest son of Sinvula Maiba. He succeeded his elder brother Mutwa Liswani II, who died in 1996. He has also maintained the headquarters placed at Vwikalo (Buikalo), Caprivi Strip, Namibia by his late brother

Ways of life
They live off farming and gathering, hunting, and fishing. The women are responsible for farming activities while the men deal with the hunting and fishing. Their staple food is hard porridge (inkoko) with fish or sour milk (masanza).

Villages
The Masubia villages are called minzi. The homes consist of huts made up of a mud wall and thatch roof or houses with concrete walls and sheet metal roofs. The huts are surrounded by a reed fence known as ilapa. The villages often consist of 15 to 30 families..

Nkuhaane village names are given in accordance or with consideration to major life events that took place or were believed to have taken place in that area such as 
the main villages of the Nkuhaane people are Ibbu, Mahundu, Vuruha, Mutikitila, Ngala, Mbalasinte, Ciseke ca banyai, Ioma, Bbwaara, Cizungwe, and Iseke.

Religion
Masubia religion is based on ancestor worship, wherein the deceased ancestors are regarded as guardian spirits. Those who do not honor nor show respect to these spirits are punished. They believe that these spirits have a connection with the Creator, and serve as mediators. According to the Joshua Project, forty percent of the Masubia are Christians while sixty percent practice ethnic religion.

Culture
The Masubia are well known for their vibrant cultural dances known as Chiperu and Chizo and their traditional attire, Musisi.

References

Ethnic groups in Namibia
Zambezi Region
Ethnic groups divided by international borders